A.M.P.E.D. is a 2007 American television series created by Vince Gilligan and Frank Spotnitz.

Overview
Police officials work to stop an epidemic from spreading that causes genetic mutations in victims and makes them violent and destructive.

References

External links

Spike (TV network) original programming
2000s American science fiction television series
2007 American television series debuts
2007 American television series endings